An American Christmas Carol is a 1979 American made-for-television fantasy drama film directed by Eric Till and loosely based on Charles Dickens' 1843 novella A Christmas Carol.

Plot
In Depression-era Concord, New Hampshire, a miserly businessman named Benedict Slade receives a long-overdue attitude adjustment one Christmas Eve when he is visited by three ghostly figures who resemble three of the people whose possessions Slade had seized to collect on unpaid loans. Assuming the roles of the Ghosts of Christmas Past, Present, and Future from Charles Dickens' classic story, the three apparitions force Slade to face the consequences of his skinflint ways, and he becomes a caring, generous, and more amiable man.

Academy Award-winning special make-up effects artist Rick Baker consulted on the aging makeup for star Henry Winkler.

Cast

Home media
An American Christmas Carol was released on DVD on November 23, 1999. It was released on Blu-ray in December 2012.

See also 
 List of Christmas films
 List of ghost films
 Adaptations of A Christmas Carol

References

External links

 
An American Christmas Carol at YouTube Movies and Shows

1979 television films
1979 films
1970s Christmas films
1970s Christmas drama films
1970s fantasy drama films
ABC network original films
American Christmas drama films
American fantasy drama films
Christmas television films
Films based on A Christmas Carol
Films directed by Eric Till
Films set in 1933
Films set in New Hampshire
Films shot in Ontario
Great Depression films
1970s English-language films
1970s American films